Rhododendron macabeanum, the McCabe rhododendron, is a species of flowering plant in the heath family, Ericaceae. It is native to Assam and Manipur in northeastern India. The felted undersides are a grey or buff colour. The flowers, borne in trusses in spring, are bell-shaped, pale to deep yellow, with a purple basal blotch.

In cultivation in the UK Rhododendron macabeanum has gained the Royal Horticultural Society’s Award of Garden Merit. It is hardy down to  but requires a sheltered spot in dappled shade, and an acid soil enriched with leaf mould.

References 

macabeanum
Taxa named by Isaac Bayley Balfour
Taxa named by George Watt (botanist)